Matthew Paul Olmos is an American playwright from Los Angeles, California. Now living in Brooklyn, New York, he is most well known for his play the living'life of the daughter mira, which won Arizona Theatre Company's 2015 National Latino Playwriting Award and was named one of the Best Unproduced Latin@ Plays 2017 by the 50 Playwrights Project., and so go the ghosts of mexico a three-play cycle about the US-Mexico drug wars.

Biography 
Matthew Paul Olmos was born in Montebello, California and raised in South Pasadena, California by his parents, a police officer and Labor/Delivery nurse. He began writing in early high school, where he enjoyed rewriting lyrics to songs and thinking about their rhythm and poetry. Classmates would occasionally pay him to write poems for their girlfriends. Olmos transferred to University of California, Santa Barbara in his junior year, where he was drawn to acting and writing. Originally planning to write, direct and act in movies, Olmos was not exposed to theatre until his senior year of college when he took an Intro to Playwriting course. Olmos stayed an extra year and switched his major to receive a B.A in Playwriting, after his professor told him he had talent for playwriting.

Olmos moved to Brooklyn, New York in 2001 to pursue playwriting. He received his M.F.A in Playwriting from the New School of Drama in 2004.

Career 
Olmos's earlier productions include The Vampire Lesson and the beautifulest room produced by the Actors Studio Repertory at Westbeth Theatre in New York and seal sings its song, Wonders of the Human Body, and locomotive produced by the Gene Frankel Theatre in New York City. Olmos co-founded woken'glacier theatre company where he served as Artistic Director. In 2009, his play i put the fear of méxico in'em, which was developed while he was in residency at INTAR theatre got him selected as a Sundance Institute Time Warner Storytelling Fellow. From 2009–2011, Olmos spent time in the Mabou Mines/Suite Resident Artist Program where, under the mentorship of Ruth Maleczech, he developed a piece titled The Nature of Captivity, which won top prize for the Americas in BBC's International Playwriting Competition. Olmos worked at the Lark Play Development Center before quitting to be a full-time playwright. In 2012, Olmos worked in residence at New Dramatists as part of his Princess Grace Fellowship. In 2013, Olmos was selected in the Ucross Foundation's Sundance Institute Theatre Program. In the same year, he received the inaugural Ellen Stewart Emerging Playwright Award. In 2015, Olmos was selected as a Baryshnikov Arts Center Resident Artist.

so go the ghosts of méxico 
Sam Shepard selected Olmos to create an original work to be produced by La MaMa, e.t.c. as a result of receiving the Ellen Stewart Emerging Playwright Award. so go the ghosts of méxico, part one directed by Meiyin Wang premiered in April 2013 to positive reception. Based on Marisol Valles García, the "Bravest Woman in Mexico," the play uses ghosts, a magic radio and other supernatural elements to give a poetic interpretation of the story of the 22-year-old woman who becomes chief of police after the previous chief of police is tortured and beheaded by the drug cartels.

Olmos has stated that so go the ghosts of méxico is a three-play cycle that is thematically connected but each play features entirely different characters and circumstances. Part one's focus is on the political becoming personal. Part two hones in on the drug cartels themselves, but was played by an all-women cast as a critique on the machismo in that realm. Part three centers on U.S involvement. All three plays feature ghosts and a prominent use of music.

In 2016, the Undermain Theatre, in Dallas, TX, committed to producing the entire cycle of plays over the course of three seasons, as announced in American Theatre.

Views on theatre 
Olmos has said he believes there are two categories of theater: “1. the type that “theater people” buy tickets (or get comped) to see and 2. the type that we feel comfortable taking ‘non-theater people’ to see.” Olmos has issues with most theatre as being too pretentious and self-indulgent or lacking in substance. Theater is too "safe" of an art form and many groups simply put on shows that have audiences sit quietly for 90 minutes, then leave, which makes theatre irrelevant. Instead, Olmos hopes theatre allows itself to become more "relevant, dangerous and exciting," where any non-theater person can enjoy and have an engaging experience. Olmos enjoys writing that takes risks and is not afraid to anger, challenge, confuse and engage an audience. Olmos thinks it is important to create theater that is important to the world that anyone can watch and to avoid "doing art for art's sake." He enjoys the works of writers like Rogelio Martinez, Mando Alvarado, Caitlin Saylor Stephens, Samuel Hunter and companies like The Assembly and The TEAM.

Writing style 
Many of Olmos' characters speak in a "stylized rhythm" based on how he hears Mexicans from the West Coast speak. When asked about his use of lower case and punctuation, Olmos has said that he has never been especially good with grammar and has a very small vocabulary, but he loves the endless ways people can communicate casually and tries to show that in his writing. Olmos focuses on writing about underrepresented, marginalized "have'nots." According to him, the majority of works in theatre are about people with social class, which he finds elitist. Olmos only writes stories with political or social relevance, and often incorporates fantastical elements within them as a way to "embrace theatricality" and "expand our imaginations." The fantastic elements in his worlds are also a way to approach the many ridiculous, unexplainable things people do to each other in the real world. Olmos hopes when writing about the underrepresented types of people that do not typically attend theater, that if they saw his play, they could connect through the theatrics or "hyper-realistic" elements in his work. Olmos likes to write about the small boundaries people create around themselves and often overlook. He finds that these boundaries that separate us and cause loneliness are ridiculous and that by writing about them we can recognize them and be able to look across them.

Accolades 
 UCLA's GOP Award for Graduate Playwriting  
 Sundance Institute Time Warner Storytelling Fellow (2009)  
 BBC's International Playwriting Competition (2011)  
 La MaMa e.t.c.'s Ellen Stewart Emerging Playwright Award (2012–13)  
 Princess Grace Award in Playwriting (2012)  
 Arizona Theatre Company's National Latino Playwriting Award (2015)

Works

Full length plays 
 the shooters of an american president
 "i am a drop'dead gorgeous, fabulous, stylish, exotic'ass gem amongst thousands of rocks" by elliot rodger
 the living'life of the daughter mira
 The OLMOS FAMILY Play
 so go the ghosts of méxico, part one
 so go the ghosts of méxico, part two
 so go the ghosts of méxico, part three
 i put the fear of méxico in'em
 The Nature of Captivity
 monkey
 nobody rides a locomotive no'mo
 the death of the slow'dying scuba diver

Essays 
 Extraordinary Jokes with Saviana Stanescu
 The Elaborate Theater of Kristoffer Diaz
 The Broken Lines of Tommy Smith
 The Edge of Togetherness in Carla Ching
 The Past and Future Sunsets of Dominique Morisseau
 Jesus in India: Finding Out Who We Are with Lloyd Suh
 Young Jean Lee: Inviting Everyone into the Room, Straight White Men, Too

References

External links
 

Year of birth missing (living people)
Living people
21st-century American dramatists and playwrights
Hispanic and Latino American dramatists and playwrights
The New School alumni
University of California, Santa Barbara alumni
American writers of Mexican descent
People from Montebello, California